Claudio Bermúdez (born 31 December 1971, Mexico City) is a Mexican songwriter, musician, songwriter, producer, arranger, engineer and actor.
He started his acting career at 12 years old.  He studied piano with his father, the concert pianist José Luis Bermúdez at 7 years old. His first experience as singer was at 16 years old, singing mariachi.
In 1989, Claudio Bermúdez Cassani with 17 years old joined Timbiriche, where he shared credits with Diego Schoening, Paulina Rubio, Erik Rubín, Edith Márquez, Bibi Gaytán, Patty Tanús, and Silvia Campos. In 1990 they recorded the album "Timbiriche X", a big success. The band won multiple gold and platinum discs and had a long two-year tour in Mexico. In 1991, Timbiriche celebrated their 10 anniversary as a band in "La movida", a late-night TV show hosted by Verónica Castro. The same year, Claudio fines historia time with Timbiriche and decided to start a solo career. In 1994, Claudio released "Como aire fresco", produced by Rafael Pérez Botija, With 10 songs as a songwriter, which earned a gold record for 100, 000 sold copies. He reached the peak of popularity in Latin America and the billboard be making their first songs "here with me" and "you are my refuge"  He won Best New Artist on Eres Awards in 1995. In Usa he receives the ASCAP Award by the song "Ven junto a mí". 
He wrote songs for other artists like Paulina Rubio, Edith Márquez, Carlos Rivera, Cuisillos, Ragazzi.
Claudio Bermudez wrote an álbum dedicated to God and he returned with album "Estoy contigo" in 2001. In 2006, Claudio produce main song by movie "Open season", performed by REYLI BARBA In the 2007, participated in programa "Disco de oro” .
In 2010 Claudio wrote, arrange and produced his third album "Vida".

Discography

Discography with Timbiriche 
 Timbiriche 10 (1990)

Discography as solo 
 Como aire fresco (1994)
 Estoy contigo (2001)
Disco Vida en el  año de 2011

T.V. Programs 
 Disco de oro (2007) Participó como concursante.

References

1971 births
Living people
20th-century Mexican male singers
Timbiriche members
Singers from Mexico City
Mexican people of Italian descent
21st-century Mexican male singers